Jerash ( Ǧaraš; ;) is a city in northern Jordan. The city is the administrative center of the Jerash Governorate, and has a population of 50,745 as of 2015.

The earliest evidence of settlement in Jerash is in a Neolithic site known as Tal Abu Sowan, where rare human remains dating to around 7500 BC were uncovered. Jerash flourished during the Greek, Hellenistic, Roman, and Byzantine periods until the mid-eighth century CE, when the 749 Galilee earthquake destroyed large parts of it, while subsequent earthquakes contributed to additional destruction. However, in the year 1120, Zahir ad-Din Toghtekin, atabeg of Damascus ordered a garrison of forty men to build up a fort in an unknown site of the ruins of the ancient city, likely the highest spot of the city walls in the north-eastern hills. It was captured in 1121 by Baldwin II, King of Jerusalem, and utterly destroyed. Then, the Crusaders immediately abandoned Jerash and withdrew to Sakib (Seecip); the eastern border of the settlement.

Jerash was then deserted until it reappeared in the historical record at the beginning of Ottoman rule in the area during the early 16th century. In the census of 1596, it had a population of 12 Muslim households. However, archaeologists found a small Mamluk hamlet in the Northwest Quarter which indicates that Jerash was resettled before the Ottoman era. The excavations conducted since 2011 have shed light on the Middle Islamic period as recent discoveries have uncovered a large concentration of Middle Islamic/Mamluk structures and pottery. The ancient city has been gradually revealed through a series of excavations which commenced in 1925, and continue to this day.

Jerash today is home to one of the best preserved Greco-Roman cities, which earned it the nickname of "Pompeii of the Middle East". Approximately 330,000 visitors arrived in Jerash in 2018, making it one of the most visited sites in Jordan. The city hosts the Jerash Festival, one of the leading cultural events in the Middle East that attracts tens of thousands of visitors every year.

History

Neolithic age

Archaeologists have found ruins of settlements dating back to the Neolithic Age. Moreover, in August 2015, an archaeological excavation team from the University of Jordan unearthed two human skulls that date back to the Neolithic period (7500–5500 BC) at a site in Jerash, which forms solid evidence of inhabitance of Jordan in that period especially with the existence of 'Ain Ghazal Neolithic settlement in Amman. The importance of the discovery lies in the rarity of the skulls, as archaeologists estimate that a maximum of 12 sites across the world contain similar human remains.

Bronze age
Evidence of settlements dating to the Bronze Age (3200 BC – 1200 BC) have been found in the region.

Hellenistic period

Jerash is the site of the ruins of the Greek city of Gerasa, also referred to as Antioch on the Golden River.
Ancient Greek inscriptions from the city support that the city was founded by Alexander the Great and his general Perdiccas, who allegedly settled aged Macedonian soldiers there during the spring of 331 BC, when he left Egypt and crossed Syria en route to Mesopotamia. However, other sources, namely the city's former name of "Antioch on the Chrysorrhoas, point to a founding by Seleucid King Antioch IV, while still others attribute the founding to Ptolemy II of Egypt.

Roman period

After the Roman conquest in 63 BC, Jerash and the land surrounding it were annexed to the Roman province of Syria, and later joined the Decapolis league of cities. The historian Josephus mentions the city as being principally inhabited by Syrians, and also having a small Jewish community. In AD 106, Jerash was absorbed into the Roman province of Arabia, which included the cities of Philadelphia (modern day Amman), Petra and Bostra. The Romans ensured security and peace in this area, which enabled its people to devote their efforts and time to economic development and encouraged civic building activity.

Jerash is considered one of the largest and most well-preserved sites of Greek and Roman architecture in the world outside Italy. And is sometimes misleadingly referred to as the "Pompeii of the Middle East" or of Asia, referring to its size, extent of excavation and level of preservation.

Jerash was the birthplace of the mathematician Nicomachus of Gerasa (c. 60 – c. 120 AD).

In the second half of the 1st century AD, the city of Jerash achieved great prosperity. In AD 106, the Emperor Trajan constructed roads throughout the province, and more trade came to Jerash. The Emperor Hadrian visited Jerash in AD 129–130. The triumphal arch (or Arch of Hadrian) was built to celebrate his visit.

Byzantine period

The city finally reached a size of about  within its walls. Beneath the foundations of a Byzantine church that was built in Jerash in AD 530 there was discovered a mosaic floor with ancient Greek and Hebrew-Aramaic inscriptions. The presence of the Hebrew-Aramaic script has led scholars to think that the place was formerly a synagogue, before being converted into a church. 
Jerash was invaded by Persian Sassanids in AD 614.
Few years later, the Byzantine army was defeated in the Battle of the Yarmuk by the invading Muslim forces and these territories became part of the Rashidun Caliphate.

Early Muslim period
The city flourished during the Umayyad Caliphate. It had numerous shops and issued coins with the mint named "Jerash" in Arabic. It was also a center for ceramic manufacture; moulded ceramic lamps had Arabic inscriptions that showed the potter's name and Jerash as the place of manufacture. The large mosque and several churches that continued to be used as places of worship, indicated that during the Umayyad period Jerash had a sizable Muslim community that co-existed with the Christians. In CE 749, a devastating earthquake destroyed much of Jerash and its surroundings.

Crusader period
In the early 12th century a fortress was built by a garrison stationed in the area by the Zahir ad-Din Toghtekin, atabeg of Damascus. Baldwin II, King of Jerusalem, captured and burned the fortress in 1121–1122 CE. Although the site of the fortification has often been identified with the ruins of the temple of Artemis, there is no evidence of the creation of a fortification in the temple in the 12th century. The location of this fort is probably to be found at the highest point of the city walls, in the north-eastern hills.

Mid to Late Muslim period
Small settlements continued in Jerash during the Mamluk Sultanate, and Ottoman periods. This occurred particularly in the Northwest Quarter and around the Temple of Zeus, where several Middle Islamic/Mamluk domestic structures have now been excavated.

It had a population of 12 Muslim households. They paid a fixed tax-rate of 25%  on various  agricultural products, including wheat, barley, olive trees/fruit trees, goats and beehives, in addition to  occasional revenues and a press for olive oil/grape syrup; a total of  6,000 akçe.

In 1838 Jerash was noted as a ruin.

Climate
Jerash has a hot-summer Mediterranean climate (Köppen climate classification Csa).

Archaeology
One of the first to explore the site of Jerash in the 19th century was Prince Abamelek. Excavation and restoration of Jerash has been almost continuous since the 1920s.

Greco-Roman period

Remains in the Greco-Roman Gerasa include:
 The unique oval plaza, which is surrounded by a fine Ionic colonnade
 The two large sanctuaries dedicated to Artemis and Zeus with their well preserved temples
 Two theatres (the South Theatre and the North Theatre)
 The long colonnaded street or cardo and its side streets or decumani
 The two tetrapyla of Jerash, one at the intersection of northern-decumanus and cardo maximus and the other at the intersection of southern-Decumanus and cardo maximus
 The Hadrian's Arch
 The circus/hippodrome
 Two major thermae (communal baths complexes)
 A large nymphaeum fed by an aqueduct
 A beautiful macellum or porticoed market
 A trapezoidal plaza delimited by two open-exedra buildings
 An almost complete circuit of city walls
 Two large bridges across the nearby river
 An extramural sanctuary with large pools and a small theatre.

Most of these monuments were built by donations of the city's wealthy citizens. 
The south theatre has a focus in the centre of the pit in front of the stage, marked by a distinct stone, and from which normal speaking can be heard easily throughout the auditorium.
In 2018, at least 14 marble sculptures were discovered in the excavation of the Eastern Baths of Gerasa, including images of Aphrodite and Zeus.

Late Roman and Early Byzantine period
A large Christian community lived in Jerash. A large cathedral was built in the city in the 4th century, the first of at least 14 churches built between the 4th and the 7th-century, many with superb mosaic floors. 
The supposed sawmill of Gerasa is well described in the Visitors Centre. The use of water power to saw wood or stone is well known in the Roman world: the invention occurred in the 3rd century BC. They converted the rotary movement from the mill into a linear motion using a crankshaft; good examples are known also from Hierapolis and Ephesus.

Early Muslim period 
 Rashidun Mosque
 Umayyad Mosques
 Umayyad Houses
Jarash, view of archaeological site from south west

Archaeological Museums 
The archaeological site of Jerash has two museums in which are displayed archaeological materials and corresponding information about the site and its rich history. The Jerash Archaeological Museum, which is the older of the two museums, is found on top of the mound known as "Camp Hill" just east of the Cardo and overlooking the Oval Plaza. The small museum contains a chronological display of artifacts found in and around Jerash from prehistoric to Islamic times. The museum displays a unique group of small statues of a group identified as the Muses of the Olympic pantheon which were discovered at Jerash in 2016. The statues, which are Roman in date, were found in a fragmentary condition and have been partially restored. The museum also contains a well-preserved lead sarcophagus dated to the late 4th to 5th centuries and features Christian and pagan symbolism. The museum also has a number of sculptures, altars, and mosaics displayed outside. 

The Jerash Visitor Center serves as a more recent archaeological museum, and presents the site of Jerash in a thematic approach with a focus on the evolution and development of the city of Jerash over time, as well as economy, technology, religion, and daily life. The center also displays further sculptures discovered in Jerash in 2016, including restored statues of Zeus and Aphrodite, as well as a marble head thought to represent the Roman Empress Julia Domna.

Modern Jerash

Jerash has developed dramatically in the last century with the growing importance of the tourism industry in the city. Jerash is now the second-most popular tourist attraction in Jordan, closely behind the ruins of Petra. On the western side of the city, which contained most of the representative buildings, the ruins have been carefully preserved and spared from encroachment, with the modern city sprawling to the east of the river which once divided ancient Jerash in two.

Territorial expansion
Recently the city of Jerash has expanded to include many of the surrounding areas.

Demographics
Jerash has an ethnically diverse population. The vast majority are Arabs, though the population includes small numbers of Kurds, Circassians and Armenians. A majority is Muslim.

Jerash became a destination for many successive waves of foreign migrants. In 1885, the Ottoman authorities directed the Circassian immigrants who were mainly of peasant stock to settle in Jerash, and distributed arable land among them. The new immigrants have been welcomed by the local people. Later, Jerash also witnessed waves of Palestinian refugees who flowed to the region in 1948 and 1967. The Palestinian refugees settled in two camps; Souf camp near the town of Souf and Gaza (Jerash) camp at Al Ḩaddādah village.

The Jordanian census of 1961 found 3,796 inhabitants in Jerash, of whom 270 were Christians.

According to the Jordan national census of 2004, the population of the city was 31,650 and was ranked as the 14th largest municipality in Jordan. According to the last national census in 2015, the population of the city was 50,745, while the population of the governorate was 237,059.

Culture and entertainment

Since 1981, the old city of Jerash has hosted the Jerash Festival of Culture and Arts, a three-week-long summer program of dance, music, and theatrical performances. The festival is frequently attended by members of the royal family of Jordan and is hailed as one of the largest cultural activities in the region.

In addition performances of the Roman Army and Chariot Experience (RACE) were started at the hippodrome in Jerash. The show runs twice daily, at 11 am and at 2 pm, and at 10 am on Fridays, except Tuesdays. It features forty-five legionaries in full armour in a display of Roman army drill and battle tactics, ten gladiators fighting "to the death" and several Roman chariots competing in a classical seven-lap race around the ancient hippodrome.

Economy
Jerash's economy largely depends on commerce and tourism. Jerash is also a main source of the highly educated and skilled workforce in Jordan. The location of the city, being just half an hour ride from the largest three cities in Jordan (Amman, Zarqa and Irbid), makes Jerash a good business location.

Education
Jerash has two universities: Jerash Private University and Philadelphia University.

Tourism
The number of tourists who visited the ancient city of Jerash reached 214,000 during 2005. The number of non-Jordanian tourists was 182,000 last year, and the sum of entry charges reached JD900,000. The Jerash Festival of Culture and Arts is an annual
celebration of Arabic and international culture during the summer months. Jerash is located 48 km north of the capital city of Amman. The festival site is located within the ancient ruins of Jerash, some of which date to the Roman age (63 BC). The Jerash Festival is a festival which features poetry recitals, theatrical performances, concerts and other forms of art. In 2008, authorities launched the Jordan Festival, a nationwide theme-oriented event under which the Jerash Festival became a component. However, the government revived the Jerash Festival as the "substitute (Jordan Festival) proved to be not up to the message intended from the festival."

Gallery

See also
 Exorcism of the Gerasene demoniac
 Jerash Cathedral
 Scythopolis (Beth-Shean)
 Temple of Artemis, Jerash

References

Bibliography
 

 (p. 462)

External links
 Photos of Jerash from the American Center of Research
Photos of Jerash from the Manar al-Athar photo archive

Archaeological sites in Jordan
Decapolis
Former populated places in Southwest Asia
Populated places in Jerash Governorate
Roman towns and cities in Jordan
1910 establishments in the Ottoman Empire